Yumatovo (Yomataw) is a rural locality (a village) in Yumatovsky Selsoviet, Ufimsky District, Bashkortostan, Russia. The population was 1,598 as of 2010. There are 37 streets.

Geography 
Yumatovo is located 39 km southwest of Ufa (the district's administrative centre) by road. Sanatoriya Yumatova imeni 15-letiya BASSR is the nearest rural locality.

References 

Rural localities in Ufimsky District